This is a list of games by Marvelous Entertainment. This list pertains to games that were published  onward, after the purchase of Victor Interactive Software was complete. Games published by the privately owned subsidiary Rising Star Games in Europe are also included on this list.

Microsoft Windows

Xbox 360

Game Boy Advance

Nintendo GameCube

Nintendo DS

Wii

Nintendo 3DS

PlayStation 2

PlayStation Portable

PlayStation 3

Arcade

References

Footnotes

 Release dates indicate the first release of a game by MMV or Rising Star Games, preceding or subsequent releases may have been done by another publisher.
 North American titles are used where applicable. Otherwise, the first title of the MMV or Rising Star Games release is used.
 North American releases are co-published with XSEED Games & Natsume
 Rising Star Games' titles are distributed in Australia by Nintendo Australia and AFA Interactive.

 
Marvelous Entertainment